James A. Robinson (born 1960) is a British economist and political scientist.

James A. Robinson may also refer to:

 James A. Robinson (American political scientist) (born 1932), American political scientist
 J-Ro (born 1973; as James Anthony Robinson), U.S. hiphop artist

See also
 James Robinson (disambiguation)